This article lists the complete results of the group stage of the 2016 Thomas Cup in Kunshan, China.

Group A

China vs Mexico

Japan vs France

Japan vs Mexico

China vs France

France vs Mexico

China vs Japan

Group B

India vs Thailand

Indonesia vs Hong Kong

India vs Hong Kong

Indonesia vs Thailand

Indonesia vs India

Thailand vs Hong Kong

Group C

Korea vs Germany

Malaysia vs England

Malaysia vs Germany

Korea vs England

Korea vs Malaysia

England vs Germany

Group D

Denmark vs South Africa

Chinese Taipei vs New Zealand

Denmark vs New Zealand

Chinese Taipei vs South Africa

Denmark vs Chinese Taipei

New Zealand vs South Africa

References

External links
 Thomas Cup Finals 2016

2016 Thomas & Uber Cup